The Heseltine Collection was a collection of oil paintings and old-master drawings and watercolours of the English and Continental schools collected by John Postle Heseltine, a British stockbroker and artist.

History

From 1893 until his death in 1929, Heseltine was a trustee of the National Gallery and advised on the purchase of paintings, particularly works from the Dutch and Flemish schools. Beginning in 1905 and lasting for the eighteen month period between Sir Edward Poynter's retirement as director and the appointment of Charles Holroyd, he shared responsibility for running the Gallery with Lord Carlisle, a fellow trustee.

During his lifetime, he published 13 privately printed volumes of reproductions of drawings in his collection.

Heseltine collected over 600 old master drawings, including 78 Rembrandts, Rubens, 9 by Raphael (7 of which came from the Constable volume), Michelangelo, Francesco Bartolomeo, 3 portraits by Holbein, 9 by Dürer (including the portrait of Margaret of Hohenzollern), Constable, 32 by Watteau and 18 by Boucher. There were also 17 landscapes and portrait drawings by Thomas Gainsborough. In 1912, after fifty years of collecting, he sold his collection of over 600 old master drawings to the London dealer Colnaghi & Obach for a price near $1,000,000. Thirty-two of his Rembrandt drawings sold the following May at what was then a high average of over $3,750 per drawing, including The Farm (for $12,540), a portrait of Rembrandt in studio attire (for $9,375), View on the Bank of the Amstel (for $9,250), Group of Trees at the Waterside (for $8,335), Woman Asleep (for $6,220), a nude study of a woman (for $5,500), and A Young Girl Asleep (for $5,290).

Further sales of the collection occurred at Frederik Muller & Co. in Amsterdam in May 1913 and at Sotheby's in March and June 1920. The remainder of the collection, including the library, was dispersed posthumously at Sotheby's in April 1933, April 1934, May 1935, June 1935 and July 1935.

Notable pieces 
Paintings

Drawings

Heseltine's own work

References
Sources

Further reading
John Postle Heseltine Sketchbooks

External links

"Catalogue of the celebrated collection of the late J.P. Heseltine, Esq. ... comprising fine paintings by old & modern masters, important old & modern drawings, by artists of the continental schools and important drawings & water-colours by English masters, which will be sold by auction by Messrs. Sotheby & Co. ... the 27th of May, 1935"
Miscellaneous Drawings from the Heseltine Sale by Arthur M. Hind, The British Museum Quarterly: Vol. 10, No. 1 (Aug., 1935), pp. 22-24 (6 pages).

Private art collections